The 2014 African Wrestling Championships was held in Tunis, Tunisia from 28 to 30 March 2014.

Medal table

Team ranking

Medal summary

Men's freestyle

Men's Greco-Roman

Women's freestyle

References 

African Wrestling Championships
Africa
African Wrestling Championships
International sports competitions hosted by Tunisia
African Wrestling Championships